The New Zealand Open is the premier men's golf tournament in New Zealand. It has been a regular fixture on the PGA Tour of Australasia tournament schedule since the 1970s. The 2019 event was the 100th edition of the tournament. Since 2014 it has been held as a pro-am in February or March.

Prize money for the 2020 event was NZ$1.4 million, with an additional NZ$50,000 for the pro-am; the tournament winner received NZ$252,000. The reigning champion is Brad Kennedy who finished two ahead of Lucas Herbert in the 2020 event; the 2021 and 2022 editions were cancelled due to risks associated with the COVID-19 pandemic.

History
The New Zealand Amateur Championship had been played since 1893 and at the 1906 championship meeting in Christchurch it was decided to hold a 36-hole Open Championship at the championship meeting in 1907, "open to any professional or amateur in any part of the world" with prizes of £25 and £10 for the leading professionals. The 1907 championship meeting was held at Napier Golf Club. The first round of the Open was played on the morning of 10 September, the amateurs also competing in a club team event. The professional David Hood and amateur J. Carne Bidwell led with rounds of 80. A handicap event was held on the following day and the second round of the Open was played on the morning of 12 September. The amateur Arthur Duncan had a second round of 76 to win with a score of 159, seven ahead of J. Carne Bidwell. The Scottish professional, Jack McLaren, finished third on 167 with David Hood fourth on 168. McLaren and Hood took the cash prizes of £25 and £10.

In 1908 the tournament was extended to 72 holes, and was won by Joe Clements, the first notable New Zealand-born professional golfer. There were no Opens from 1915 to 1918 due to World War I and the championship was again cancelled from 1940 to 1945 due to World War II.

In early 1923, G. Brodie Breeze, a golf club maker in Glasgow offered a trophy for the event, an offer that was accepted by the New Zealand Golf Association. The trophy was first presented to the 1923 winner, Arthur Brooks, and is held "from year to year" by the winner of the Open. The Jellicoe Cup was presented by Viscount Jellicoe, the second Governor-General of New Zealand, in 1924 and is awarded for the lowest round in the championship. The Bledisloe Cup was presented by Lord Bledisloe, the fourth Governor-General, in 1934 and is awarded to the leading amateur.

The 1937 event was thought to be won by Alex Murray. However, shortly after the tournament ended it was discovered that Murray hit a putt while his playing partner was also putting. Though unintentional, this was a rule violation. Murray was therefore disqualified. John Hornabrook, the reigning New Zealand Amateur champion, Andrew Shaw, the defending New Zealand Open champion, and Ernie Moss played off for title the following day. Hornabrook won the 18-hole playoff.

In 1954 Bob Charles, who was later to become the only New Zealander to win a major championship in the 20th century, won as an 18-year-old amateur. He won again in 1966, 1971 and 1973, as a professional, and he and the two Australian major champions Peter Thomson and Kel Nagle dominated the event from the early 1950s to the mid-1970s. Thomson won the event nine times while Nagle won it seven times.

In 1966 Australian professionals were banned from playing in the tournament by the Australian PGA. The intention of the Australian PGA was to protect the North Coast Open tournament at Coffs Harbour, Australia and ensure that all of the best Australian players entered that event. Despite the ban, Kel Nagle and Len Thomas played in the event.

Other well known winners have included the American Corey Pavin in 1984 and 1985, and Michael Campbell in 2000. Campbell joined Charles as a major champion when he won the 2005 U.S. Open.

In 2002 Tiger Woods took part as a thank you to his New Zealand caddie Steve Williams, but he did not win. His participation caused some controversy when ticket prices were raised sharply that year.

The New Zealand Open is a PGA Tour of Australasia tournament, and in 2005 was co-sanctioned for the first time by the European Tour, which led to a doubling of the prize fund to 1.5 million New Zealand Dollars. The European Tour had co-sanctioned PGA Tour of Australasia events before, but they had all been in Australia, making this the tour's first ever visit to New Zealand. In 2006 the event was moved to November, taking its place on the European Tour schedule for the following calendar year. The 2007 event was the last to be co-sanctioned by the European Tour, and with the tournament being rescheduled to March, there was also no New Zealand Open on the 2008 Australasian Tour. The 2009 and 2010 tournaments were also co-sanctioned by the Nationwide Tour, the official development tour of the PGA Tour. From 2011 to 2017 it was solely sanctioned by the PGA Tour of Australasia while since 2018 it has been co-sanctioned by the Asian Tour. Since 2014 it has also been run in partnership with the Japan Golf Tour, an arrangement whereby a number of golfers from that tour compete in the event, although it is not an official event on the Japanese tour.

Since 2014 the Championship has been a pro-am event. A professional field of 156 play with an amateur partner for the first two rounds, alternately at The Hills and Millbrook Resort before the second round cut of 60 and ties. From 2014 to 2016 and in 2019 the final two rounds of the championship were played at The Hills. In 2017, 2018 and 2020 they were played at Millbrook Resort. The New Zealand Pro-Am Championship runs alongside the main tournament in a best-ball format. After a second round cut, the top 40 pro-am pairs progress to the third round, with a further cut to the top 10 pairs who play in the final round.

The New Zealand Open was cancelled in 2021 and 2022 due to the global COVID-19 pandemic.

Venues

Since 2014 the first two rounds have been played on two different courses, everyone playing one round on each course. After the cut, one of the courses is then used for the final two rounds. The number in brackets refers to the occasions where the course was just used for the first two rounds.

Winners

Sources:

Bledisloe Cup winners
The Bledisloe Cup was presented by Lord Bledisloe, the fourth Governor-General, in 1934 and is awarded to the leading amateur.

 1934 Bryan Silk
 1935 Arthur Duncan
 1936 Bryan Silk
 1937 John Hornabrook
 1938 Tony Gibbs
 1939 John Hornabrook
 1946 Bob Glading
 1947 Bob Glading
 1948 Bryan Silk
 1949 L.B. Johnston
 1950 Tim Woon
 1951 Tim Woon
 1952 Harry Berwick
 1953 Tim Woon
 1954 Bob Charles
 1955 Stuart Jones
 1956 Harry Berwick
 1957 Bob Charles
 1958 Ross Murray
 1959 Stuart Jones
 1960 Stuart Jones
 1961 John Durry
 1962 Walter Godfrey
 1963 Bryan Silk
 1964 Peter Rankin
 1965 Ross Murray
 1966 John Durry
 1967 Ted McDougall
 1968 R.M. Farrant
 1969 J.M. Lacy
 1970 Ted McDougall
 1971 Geoff Clarke
 1972 Chris Alldred
 1973 Stuart Jones
 1974 D.L. Beggs, Stuart Reese
 1975 Rick Barker
 1976 Geoff Saunders
 1977 David Meredith
 1978 Phil Mosley
 1979 Michael Atkinson, Phil Aickin
 1980 Phil Aickin
 1981 Phil Aickin
 1982 John Williamson
 1983 Peter Creighton
 1984 Paul Devenport
 1985 Owen Kendall
 1986 Michael Barltrop, Glen Goldfinch
 1987 P. Fox
 1988 Phil Tataurangi
 1989 Steven Alker
 1991 Tony Christie
 1992 Grant Moorhead
 1993 Richard Lee, Phil Tataurangi
 1994 Glen Goldfinch
 1995 (Jan) Mark Brown
 1995 (Dec) Mark Brown
 1996 Brad Heaven
 1997 David Somervaille
 1998 Reon Sayer
 2000 Aaron Baddeley
 2001 Eddie Lee
 2002 Adam Groom
 2003 Chris Johns
 2004 Brad Heaven
 2005 Josh Geary
 2006 James Gill, Troy Ropina
 2007 Danny Lee
 2009 Thomas Spearman-Burn
 2010 Matt Jager
 2011 Jake Higginbottom
 2012 Jake Higginbottom
 2014 Jordan Bakermans
 2015 Joshua Munn
 2016 Daniel Hillier
 2017 Ryan Chisnall
 2018 Daniel Hillier
 2019 Lee Jang-hyun
 2020 Jimmy Zheng

Notes

References

External links

Coverage on the PGA Tour of Australasia's official site
Coverage on the Asian Tour's official site
Coverage on the European Tour's official site

PGA Tour of Australasia events
Former Asian Tour events
Former Korn Ferry Tour events
Former European Tour events
Golf tournaments in New Zealand
Recurring sporting events established in 1907
1907 establishments in New Zealand
International Sports Promotion Society